Festuca lenensis, also known as the tundra fescue, is a species of grass in the family Poaceae. It is native throughout Siberia to the far east of Russia and Subarctic America. It is perennial, and mainly grows in subalpine or subarctic biomes. Festuca lenensis was first published in 1915.

References

lenensis